Eccles Pike is an isolated hill three miles west of Chapel en le Frith in the Derbyshire Peak District. It consists of gritstone, pink in colour at the summit. While not as prominent as the surrounding hills of Cracken Edge and Combs Moss, it is popular with walkers. Combs Reservoir lies just south of the hill.

The name 'pike' means pointed hill; it's not known how it acquired the name Eccles, or whether this name relates to the town on the other side of Manchester famous for its currant cakes.

Eccles Pike Fell Race

The Eccles Pike Fell Race is reputedly one of the oldest fell races in the country, dating back to the beginning of the 20th century. It is renowned for being short, tough and demanding.

Commemorative plaque
At the top of the hill is a commemorative plaque known as a topograph, showing a 360° relief of the surrounding landscape.

References  

Mountains and hills of the Peak District
Mountains and hills of Derbyshire
Mountains and hills of the United Kingdom with toposcopes
Chapel-en-le-Frith